Achromobacter piechaudii is a Gram-negative, aerobic, oxidase-positive, rod-shaped, motile bacterium from the genus Achromobacter. The complete genome of A. piechaudii has been sequenced.

See also
 List of sequenced bacterial genomes

References

External links
Type strain of Achromobacter piechaudii at BacDive -  the Bacterial Diversity Metadatabase

Burkholderiales
Bacteria described in 1998